Shaun Holmes (born 27 December 1980 in Derry, Northern Ireland) is a Northern Irish footballer.

Career
He had previously played for Derry City in the League of Ireland but was released by the club on 14 December 2006, as he was not seen as being a fundamental part of Pat Fenlon's (the new team-manager) plans. Paul Hegarty, the new manager at Finn Harps club acted quickly to snap up the free agent with whom he had worked at Derry City. Signed by Derry from Glentoran, he can operate in both a defensive and midfield role on the left side of the field.

Holmes, also formerly of Manchester City and Wrexham. On 17 August 2009 Institute signed the defender, who was recently released by Sligo Rovers.

International career
Holmes has been capped by Northern Ireland at both full and under-21 levels. He won his first international cap in the 2002 World Cup Qualifiers.

Honours
  FAW Premier Cup: 2
 Wrexham - 2002-03, 2003-04
  Irish Premier League: 1
 Glentoran - 2004-05
  Irish League Cup: 1
 Glentoran - 2004-05

References

1980 births
Living people
Association footballers from Northern Ireland
Northern Ireland international footballers
Northern Ireland under-21 international footballers
League of Ireland players
English Football League players
Manchester City F.C. players
Wrexham A.F.C. players
Glentoran F.C. players
Derry City F.C. players
Finn Harps F.C. players
Sligo Rovers F.C. players
NIFL Premiership players
Institute F.C. players
Association football defenders